Paul Franklin Clark (March 9, 1882, Portland, Maine – August 23, 1983, Livermore, California) was an American bacteriologist and virologist. He was the president of the American Society for Microbiology in 1938.

Biography
Clark graduated from the Portland Maine, High School in 1900. At Brown University, he graduated with a bachelor's degree in 1904, a master's degree in 1905, and a Ph.D. in bacteriology in 1909. His Ph.D. thesis is entitled The relation of the pseudodiphtheria and the diphtheria bacillus. At Brown University, he worked as an assistant in zoology from 1904 to 1905 and as an assistant in bacteriology from 1905 to 1906. During his years of study for the Ph.D., he also worked from 1906 to 1907 as an assistant bacteriologist for Rhode Island's State Board of Health.

In the department of bacteriology of the Rockefeller Institute for Medical Research (now named Rockefeller University), Clark was a fellow from 1909 to 1910, an assistant from 1910 to 1912, and an associate from 1912 to 1914. In the department of bacteriology of the University of Wisconsin School of Medicine and Public Health, he was an associate professor from 1914 to 1918 and a full professor from 1918 to 1946, as well as chair of the department from 1918 to 1946. He was a full professor in the department of microbiology from 1946 to 1952, when he retired as professor emeritus. From 1946 to 1948 he also chaired the department of microbiology.

From 1913 to 1914, he did postgraduate study at the  Johns Hopkins School of Medicine. Near the end of WW I, he served as a consulting bacteriologist for the Chemical Warfare Service of the U.S. Army. In 1923 he had a sabbatical year of study at the Institut Pasteur in Brussels and at the Molteno Institute for Research in Parasitology at the University of Cambridge, UK.

Clark did important research on poliomyelitis. He was elected in 1921 a Fellow of the American Association for the Advancement of Science.

In 1911 he married Alice Elizabeth Schiedt (1881–1980). They had three daughters (one of whom died in infancy) and a son.

Selected publications

Articles

Books

Sources
 Robert Cecil Cook (ed.): Who's who in American Education: A Biographical Dictionary of Eminent Living Educators of the United States, volume III, Who's Who in American Education, Nashville, Tenn., 1934, p. 154.
 Library of Congress, American Library Association. Resources and Technical Services Division: National Union Catalog: A Cumulative Author List Representing Library of Congress Printed Cards and Titles Reported by Other American Libraries, volume XIX, Library of Congress, Ann Arbor, Mich., 1968, p. 162.
 ASM News, volume 50, American Society for Microbiology, Ann Arbor Michigan, 1984, p. 104.

References

External links
 

1882 births
1983 deaths
American centenarians
Men centenarians
American bacteriologists
American virologists
Brown University alumni
Rockefeller University people
University of Wisconsin–Madison
Fellows of the American Association for the Advancement of Science
Academics from Portland, Maine
Portland High School (Maine) alumni